Jennifer Ann Thomson (born June 16, 1947) is a South African microbiologist.

She was born in Cape Town. She received a BSc in zoology from the University of Cape Town, an MA in genetics from Cambridge University and a PhD in microbiology from Rhodes University. Thomson was a post-doctoral fellow at Harvard Medical School. She was a lecturer and associate professor in the genetics department of University of the Witwatersrand. She established the Laboratory for Molecular and Cell Biology for the Council for Scientific and Industrial Research and served as its director. Then, she was professor and head of the microbiology department at the University of Cape Town. After the department was restructured, she became Emeritus Professor of Microbiology in the Molecular and Cell Biology department.

Her research has focused on developing maize which is resistant to the African endemic maize streak virus and to drought. Thomson has been chair and member of the South African Genetic Engineering Committee, co-founder and chair of South African Women in Science and Engineering and vice-president of the South Africa Academy of Science. She is a fellow of the Royal Society of South Africa. She has received the L'Oréal-UNESCO Award for Women in Science and an honorary doctorate from the Sorbonne.

References 

1947 births
Living people
South African microbiologists
Fellows of the Royal Society of South Africa
L'Oréal-UNESCO Awards for Women in Science laureates
University of Cape Town alumni
Academic staff of the University of Cape Town
Academic staff of the University of the Witwatersrand
South African women scientists
21st-century women scientists